Synarchism generally means "joint rule" or "harmonious rule". Beyond this general definition, both synarchism and synarchy have been used to denote rule by a secret elite in Vichy France, Italy, China, and Hong Kong, while being used to describe a pro-Catholic Theocracy movement in Mexico.

Origins
The earliest recorded use of the term synarchy is attributed to Thomas Stackhouse (1677–1752), an English clergyman who used the word in his New History of the Holy Bible from the Beginning of the World to the Establishment of Christianity (published in two folio volumes in 1737). The attribution can be found in the Webster's Dictionary (the American Dictionary of the English Language, published by Noah Webster in 1828). Webster's definition for synarchy is limited entirely to "joint rule or sovereignty". The word is derived from the Greek stems syn meaning "with" or "together" and archy meaning "rule".

The most substantial early use of the word synarchy comes from the writings of Alexandre Saint-Yves d'Alveydre (1842–1909), who used the term in his book La France vraie to describe what he believed was the ideal form of government. In reaction to the emergence of anarchist ideologies and movements, Saint-Yves elaborated a political formula which he believed would lead to a harmonious society. He defended social differentiation and hierarchy with collaboration between social classes, transcending conflict between social and economic groups: synarchy, as opposed to anarchy. Specifically, Saint-Yves envisioned a Federal Europe (as well as all the states it has integrated) with a corporatist government composed of three councils, one for academia, one for the judiciary, and one for commerce.

Rule by a secret elite
The word synarchy is used, especially among French and Spanish speakers, to describe a shadow government or deep state, a form of government where political power effectively rests with a secret elite, in contrast to an oligarchy where the elite is or could be known by the public.

In Vichy France
According to former OSS officer William Langer, some French industrial and banking interests even before the war, had turned to Nazi Germany and had looked to Hitler as the savior of Europe from Communism.

This theory allegedly originated with the discovery of a document called Pacte Synarchique following the death (May 19, 1941) of Jean Coutrot, former member of Groupe X-Crise, on May 15, 1941. According to this document, a Mouvement Synarchique d'Empire had been founded in 1922, with the aim of abolishing parliamentarianism and replacing it with synarchy. This led to the belief that La Cagoule, a far-right organisation, was the armed branch of French synarchism, and that some important members of the Vichy Regime were synarchists. The Vichy government ordered an investigation, leading to the Rapport Chavin but no evidence for the existence of the Mouvement Synarchiste d'Empire was found. Most of the presumed synarchists were either associated with the Banque Worms or with Groupe X-Crise; they were close to Admiral François Darlan (Vichy prime minister 1941–1942), and this has led to the belief that synarchists had engineered the military defeat of France for the profit of Banque Worms.

This belief system has been dismissed as a "work of a paranoid imagination which wove together the histories of three disparate groups of activists, creating a conspiracy among them where none existed". Most historians affirm that the Pacte Synarchique was a hoax created by some French collaborators with Nazi Germany to weaken Darlan and his Vichy technocrats. Only the far-left historian Annie Lacroix-Riz defends the idea that the synarchy existed.

Lyndon LaRouche
Lyndon LaRouche, leader of the LaRouche movement, describes a wide-ranging historical phenomenon, starting with Alexandre Saint-Yves d'Alveydre and the Martinist Order followed by important individuals, organizations, movements and regimes that are alleged to have been synarchist, including the government of Nazi Germany. He claims that during the Great Depression an international coalition of financial institutions, raw materials cartels, and intelligence operatives installed fascist regimes throughout Europe (and tried to do so in Mexico) to maintain world order and prevent the repudiation of international debts. LaRouche identifies the former U.S. vice president and former PNAC member Dick Cheney as a modern "synarchist", and claims that "synarchists" have "a scheme for replacing regular military forces of nations, by private armies in the footsteps of a privately financed international Waffen-SS like scheme, a force deployed by leading financier institutions, such as the multi-billions funding by the U.S. Treasury, of Cheney's Halliburton gang."

Other uses

Feudal China
Harvard historian and sinologist John K. Fairbank used the word synarchy in his 1953 book Trade and Diplomacy on the China Coast: The Opening of the Treaty Ports, 1842–1854, and in later writings, to describe the mechanisms of government under the Qing dynasty in China. Fairbank's synarchy is a form of joint rule by co-opting existing Manchu and Han Chinese elites and bringing the foreign powers into the system and legitimizing them through a schedule of rituals and tributes that gave them a stake in the Qing dynasty rule. He believed that the Qing, who were considered outside rulers because of their Manchu origins, developed this strategy out of necessity because they did not have a strong political base in China.

Hong Kong
The term is also used by some political scientists to describe the British colonial government in Hong Kong (1842–1997). Ambrose King, in his 1975 paper Administrative Absorption of Politics in Hong Kong, described colonial Hong Kong's administration as "elite consensual government". In it, he claimed, any coalition of elites or forces capable of challenging the legitimacy of Hong Kong's administrative structure would be co-opted by the existing apparatus through the appointment of leading political activists, business figures and other elites to oversight committees, by granting them British honours, and by bringing them into elite institutions like Hong Kong's horse racing clubs. He called this synarchy, by extension of Fairbank's use of the word.

Mexican synarchism

Synarchy is also the name of the ideology of a political movement in Mexico dating from the 1930s. In Mexico, it was historically a movement of the Roman Catholic extreme right, in some ways akin to fascism, violently opposed to the populist and secularist policies of the revolutionary (PNR, PRM, and PRI) governments that ruled Mexico from 1929 to 2000.

The National Synarchist Union (Unión Nacional Sinarquista, UNS) was founded in May 1937 by a group of Catholic political activists led by José Antonio Urquiza, who was murdered in April 1938, and Salvador Abascal. In 1946, a faction of the movement loyal to deposed leader Manuel Torres Bueno  regrouped as the Popular Force Party (Partido Fuerza Popular). Synarchism revived as a political movement in the 1970s through the Mexican Democratic Party (PDM), whose candidate, Ignacio González Gollaz, polled 1.8 percent of the vote at the 1982 presidential election. In 1988 Gumersindo Magaña polled a similar proportion, but the party then suffered a split, and, in 1992, lost its registration as a political party. It was dissolved in 1996.

There are now two organisations, both calling themselves the Unión Nacional Sinarquista, one aligning to Francoist policies, the other following the National Syndicalism of Primo De Rivera. Carlos Abascal, son of Salvador Abascal, was Mexico's Secretary of the Interior during Vicente Fox's presidency. Many sinarquistas are now militant in the National Action Party, PAN, of former presidents Vicente Fox (2000–2006) and Felipe Calderón (2006–2012).

References

Further reading
 Richard F. Kuisel (Spring 1970). "The Legend of the Vichy Synarchy." French Historical Studies, vol. 6, no. 3. pp. 365–398. .
   Olivier Dard (2012). La synarchie ou le mythe du complot permanent. Paris: Perrin. .

Esotericism
Conspiracy theories in France
Oligarchy
Political ideologies